Charleston is the capital and most populous city of the U.S. state of West Virginia and the seat of Kanawha County. Located at the confluence of the Elk and Kanawha rivers, the city had a population of 48,864 at the 2020 census and an estimated population of 48,018 in 2021. The Charleston metropolitan area as a whole had an estimated 255,020 residents in 2021. 

Early industries important to Charleston included salt and the first natural gas well. Later, coal became central to economic prosperity in the city and the surrounding area. Today, trade, utilities, government, medicine, and education play central roles in the city's economy.

The first permanent settlement, Fort Morris, was built in fall 1773 by William Morris prior to Lord Dunmore's War, and was used extensively during the American Revolution. The town of Charleston was incorporated by the Virginia House of Delegates in 1794 with the trustees being William Morris, Leonard Morris, and Daniel Boone.

Charleston is the home of the Charleston Dirty Birds of the Atlantic League of Professional Baseball, and the annual  Charleston Distance Run. Yeager Airport and the University of Charleston are in the city.  West Virginia State University is in the local area as well as West Virginia University and Marshall University satellite campuses.

History

Timeline

 1794 – "Virginia General Assembly designated 40-acres of George Clendenin's land, as Charlestown."
 1805 – "Salt-tub mill" begins operating.
 1808 – Farmers' Repository newspaper begins publication.
 1815 – Ruffner Mansion built.
 1818
 Charlestown renamed "Charleston".
 Mercer Academy established.
 1819 – Spectator newspaper begins publication.
 1841 – Kanawha Lyceum active (approximate date).
 1850 – Population: 1,050.
 1862 – Battle of Charleston fought near town during the American Civil War.
 1863 – June 20: Charleston becomes part of new U.S. state of West Virginia.
 1870
 City of Charleston incorporated.
 Charleston designated West Virginia state capital.
 1872 – Kanawha Chronicle newspaper begins publication.
 1875 – State capital moves from Charleston to Wheeling.
 1885
 State Capital moves from Wheeling back to Charleston.
 State Capitol building expanded.
 1890
 West Virginia Historical and Antiquarian Society headquartered in Charleston.
 Population: 6,742.
 1891
 Burlew Opera House in business.
 West Virginia Colored Institute founded near Charleston.
 1892 – Capitol City Commercial College founded.
 1897 – Sacred Heart Church built.
 1900 – Chamber of Commerce organized.
 1905 – State Bureau of Archives and History headquartered in Charleston.
 1906 – Mason School of Music founded.
 1909
 Charleston Public Library opens.
 Stalnaker Drugstore in business.
 1910 – Population: 22,996.
 1913 – Chemical manufactory begins operating.
 1916 – Libbey-Owens-Ford glass manufactory and Charleston High School built.
 1917 – Owens Bottle Company manufactory in business in Kanawha City.
 1919 – Town of South Charleston incorporated near Charleston.
 1920 – Charleston Daily Mail newspaper in publication.
 1921 – Charleston City Hall built.
 1922 – Kearse Theater in business.
 1923 – Sacred Heart High School established.
 1925 – West Virginia Governor's Mansion built.
 1927
 WCHS radio begins broadcasting.
 Garnett Library (public library branch) opens.
 Union Carbide manufacturer buys Blaine Island in South Charleston, near city of Charleston.
 1929 – Charleston Municipal Airport established.
 1930 – Population: 60,408.
 1932 – State Capitol building rebuilt.
 1934 – Kanawha County Public Library established.
 1935 – Morris Harvey College relocates to Charleston.
 1939
 Charleston Municipal Auditorium built.
 WGKV radio begins broadcasting.
 State Theatre in business.
 1940 – Stonewall Jackson High School built.
 1941 – Kanawha Boulevard constructed (approximate date).
 1947 – Kanawha Airport, now known as Yeager Airport, begins operating.
 1954 – WCHS-TV (television) begins broadcasting.
 1957 – WBOY-TV (television) begins broadcasting.
 1959 – Charleston Civic Center, now known as the Charleston Coliseum & Convention Center, opens.
 1960 – Population: 85,796.
 1961
 July 19: Kanawha River flood.
 Sunrise Art Museum established.
 1978 – Morris Harvey College renamed University of Charleston.
 1983 – Charleston Town Center shopping mall in business.
 1998 – City website online (approximate date).
 2003 – Clay Center for the Arts and Sciences of West Virginia opens.
 2005 – West Virginia Music Hall of Fame established
 2010 – Population: 51,400.
 2015 – Charleston Gazette-Mail newspaper is formed by the merger of the Charleston Gazette and Charleston Daily Mail.
 2020 – Population: 48,864
 2021 – Population: 48,018

Beginnings
After the American Revolutionary War, pioneers began making their way out from the early settlements. Many slowly migrated into the western part of Virginia. Capitalizing on its many resources made Charleston an important part of Virginia and West Virginia history. Today, Charleston is the largest city in the state and the state capital.

Charleston's history goes back to the 18th century. Thomas Bullitt was deeded  of land near the mouth of the Elk River in 1773. It was inherited by his brother, Cuthbert Bullitt, upon his death in 1778, and sold to Col. George Clendenin in 1786. The first permanent settlement, Fort Lee, was built in 1787 by Col. Savannah Clendenin and his company of Virginia Rangers. This structure occupied the area that is now the intersection of Brooks Street and Kanawha Boulevard. Historical conjecture indicates that Charleston is named after Col. Clendenin's father, Charles. "Charles Town" was later shortened to "Charleston" to avoid confusion with another Charles Town in eastern West Virginia, which was named after George Washington's brother Charles.

Six years later, the Virginia General Assembly officially established Charleston. On the  that made up the town in 1794, 35 people inhabited seven houses.

Charleston is part of Kanawha County. The origin of the word Kanawha (pronounced "Ka-NAH-wah"), Ka(h)nawha, derives from the region's Iroquoian dialects meaning "water way" or "Canoe Way" implying the metaphor, "transport way", in the local language. It was and is the name of the river that flows through Charleston. The grammar of the "hard H" sound soon dropped out as new arrivals of various European languages developed West Virginia. The phrase has been a matter of Register (sociolinguistics). A two-story jail was the first county structure to be built, with the first floor literally dug into the bank of the Kanawha River.

Daniel Boone, who was commissioned a lieutenant colonel of the Kanawha County militia, was elected to serve in 1791 in the Virginia House of Delegates. As told in historical accounts, Boone walked all the way to Richmond, the state capital. Boone served alongside Major William Morris Jr at the House of Delegates representing Kanawha.

Industrial growth
By the early 19th century, salt brines were discovered along the Kanawha River, and the first salt well was drilled in 1806. This created a prosperous time and great economic growth for the area. By 1808, 1,250 pounds of salt were being produced a day. An area adjacent to Charleston, Kanawha Salines, now Malden, would become the top salt producer in the world. In 1818, the Kanawha Salt Company, the first trust in the United States, went into operation.

Captain James Wilson, while drilling for salt, struck the first natural gas well in 1815. It was drilled at the site that is now the junction of Brooks Street and Kanawha Boulevard (near the present-day state capitol complex). In 1817, coal was first discovered and gradually became used as the fuel for the salt works. The Kanawha salt industry declined in importance after 1861, until the onset of World War I brought a demand for chemical products. The chemicals needed were chlorine and sodium hydroxide, which could be made from salt brine.

Political growth
The town continued to grow until the Civil War began in 1861. After the Virginia Secession Convention of 1861 and a referendum, the state of Virginia seceded from the Union.  However, Charleston, like much of western Virginia, was divided in loyalty between the Union and the Confederacy. On September 13, 1862, the Union and Confederate armies clashed in the Battle of Charleston. The Confederates won, but they could not hold the area for long. The Union soldiers returned in force just six weeks later and retook the city. Charleston would remain under Union control for the remainder of the war.

In addition to the dispute over slavery, the North wanted to separate West Virginia from the rest of the state for economic reasons. The heavy industries in the North, particularly the steel business of the upper Ohio River region, were dependent on coal from the western Virginia mines. Federal units from Ohio marched into western Virginia quite early in the war solely to capture the coal mines and control transportation in the area.

The Wheeling Convention of 1861 declared the Ordinance of Succession, and the Confederate state government in Richmond, to be illegal and void, and formed the Unionist Restored Government of Virginia.  The Restored Government and the United States Congress approved the formation of the state of West Virginia, which was admitted on June 20, 1863 as the 35th state, and the Restored Government of Virginia moved to Alexandria.

Although a state now existed, choosing a state capital location proved to be difficult. For several years, the West Virginia capital intermittently traveled between Wheeling and Charleston. In 1877, however, the citizens voted on a permanent location. Charleston received 41,243 votes, Clarksburg received 29,442 and Martinsburg received 8,046. Wheeling was not considered. Charleston won, and eight years later the first state capitol building was opened there.

After a fire in 1921, a hastily built structure was opened, but it, too, burned down in 1927. However, a Capitol Building Commission, created by the legislature in 1921, authorized construction of the present capitol. Architect Cass Gilbert designed the buff-colored Indiana limestone structure in the Italian Renaissance style, with a final cost of just under $10 million. After the three stages of construction were completed, Governor William G. Conley dedicated the West Virginia State Capitol on June 20, 1932.

20th century
Charleston became the center of state government. Natural resources, such as coal and natural gas, along with railroad expansion, also contributed to growth. New industries such as chemical, glass, timber and steel migrated to the state, attracted by the area's natural resources. There was a huge amount of new construction in Charleston. A number of those buildings, including churches and office buildings, still stand in the heart of downtown along and bordering Capitol Street.

During World War II, the first and largest styrene-butadiene plant in the U.S. opened in nearby Institute, providing a replacement for rubber to the war effort. After the war ended, Charleston was on the brink of some significant construction. One of the first during this period was Kanawha Airport (now Yeager Airport, named after General Chuck Yeager). Built in 1947, the construction encompassed clearing  on three mountaintops and moving more than nine million cubic yards of earth. The Charleston Civic Center opened in 1959.

Charleston began to be integrated into the Interstate Highway System in the 1960s when three major interstate systems—I-64, I-77 and I-79 were designated, all converging in Charleston.

Modern development
In 1983, the Charleston Town Center opened its doors downtown. It was the largest urban-based mall east of the Mississippi River, featuring three stories of shops and eateries. Downtown revitalization began in earnest in the late 1980s. Funds were set aside for streetscaping as Capitol and Quarrier streets saw new building facades, trees along the streets, and brick walkways installed. For a time, the opening of the Charleston Town Center Mall had a somewhat negative impact on the main streets of downtown Charleston, as many businesses closed and relocated into the mall. For a while, the downtown business district (outside of the mall) had a "ghost town" feel to it which took several years to turn around. Today, Capitol Street, Hale Street, and other bordering streets are an eclectic mixture of restaurants, shops, businesses and services that many call the centerpiece of downtown.

The new Robert C. Byrd Federal Building, Haddad Riverfront Park and Capitol Market are just a few new developments that have helped growth in the downtown area during the 1990s. Charleston also became known as one of the premier healthcare spots in the state. Along with ambitious thinking, plans for even new entertainment and business venues kept Charleston moving along at a steady pace.

In 1983, West Virginia Public Radio launched a live-performance radio program statewide called Mountain Stage. What began as a live, monthly statewide broadcast went on to national distribution in 1986. Now in its 34th season, Mountain Stage with Larry Groce records 26 two-hour programs each year, mostly at the Cultural Center Theater in Charleston, and is heard on over 100 radio stations through National Public Radio and around the world on the Voice of America satellite service.

2003 marked the opening of the Clay Center for the Arts & Sciences. The center includes the Maier Foundation Performance Hall, the Walker Theatre, the Avampato Discovery Museum and the Juliet Art Museum. Also on site is the ElectricSky Theater, a 175-seat combination planetarium and dome-screen cinema. Movies shown at the theatre include educational large format (70 mm) presentations and are often seen in similar Omnimax theatres. Planetarium shows are staged as a combination of pre-recorded and live presentations.

Many festivals and events were also incorporated into the calendar, including Multifest, Vandalia Festival, a July 4 celebration with fireworks at Haddad Riverfront Park, and the already popular Sternwheel Regatta, which was founded in 1970, provided a festive atmosphere for residents to enjoy. In 2005 FestivALL Charleston was established and has grown into a ten-day festival offering a variety of performances, events and exhibits in music, dance, theatre, visual arts and other entertainments.

Charleston has one central agency for its economic development efforts, the Charleston Area Alliance. The Alliance works with local public officials and the private sector to build the economy of the region and revitalize its downtown. Charleston also has an economic and community development organization focused on the East End and West Side urban neighborhood business districts, Charleston Main Streets.

Geography

Charleston is located in west-central Kanawha County at  (38.349497, −81.633294). It lies within the ecoregion of the Western Allegheny Plateau.

The city lies at the intersection of Interstates 79, 77, 64, and also where the Kanawha and Elk rivers meet.

Communities within Charleston
The following are neighborhoods and communities within the city limits:

Suburbs
The following communities are within the greater Charleston area:

Climate
Charleston has a four-season humid subtropical climate (Köppen Cfa) with continental climate (Dfa) elements. Especially in winter, Charleston's average temperatures are warmer than the rest of the state, due to the city being west of the higher elevations. Spring is the most unpredictable season, and spring-like weather usually arrives in late March or early April. From the beginning of March through early May, temperatures can vary considerably and it is not unusual at this time for day-to-day temperature fluctuations to exceed . Temperatures warm up considerably in late May, with warm summer-like days. Summer is warm to hot, with 23 days of highs at or above , sometimes reaching , often accompanied by high humidity. Autumn features crisp evenings that warm quickly to mild to warm afternoons. Snowfall generally occurs from late November to early April, with the heaviest period being January and February. Thunderstorms are frequent during the late spring and throughout the summer, and occasionally they can be quite severe, producing the rare tornado.

The hardiness zone is 7a.

Government

Charleston functions under the Mayor-Council form of city government.  The Mayor is the designated Chief Executive Officer of the city with the duty to see that all of the laws and ordinances of the city are enforced.  The Mayor gives general supervision over all executive departments, offices and agencies of the city government and is the presiding officer of the Council and a voting member thereof.  The mayor, Amy Goodwin, was sworn in Monday, January 7, 2019, and is the first female mayor in the history of Charleston.  Charleston also has a City Manager who is appointed by the Mayor and approved by the Council. The City's current City Manager is Jonathan Storage, who also assumed office on January 7, 2019. The City Manager has supervision and control of the executive work and management of the heads of all departments under his or her control as directed by the Mayor, makes all contracts for labor and supplies, and generally has the responsibility for all of the business and administrative work of the city.

The Charleston City Council has 26 members. Twenty of the council members are elected from a specific ward within the city, and an additional six members are elected by the city at-large.

General Elections for Mayor, City Council and other city officers take place in May every four years (Primary Elections are held in March).  The most recent election was in May 2019.

 Jacob Goshorn, 1861 (elected but did not serve)
 John A. Truslow, circa 1865
 John Williams
 George Ritter, 1868–1869
 John W. Wingfield, 1870
 H. Clay Dickinson, 1871 (died in office)
 John P. Hale, 1871
 John Williams, 1872
 C. P. Snyder, 1873
 John D. White, 1874
 John C. Ruby, 1875–1876
 C. J. Botkin, 1877–1881
 R. R. Delaney, 1881–1882
 John D. Baines, 1883–1884
 James Hall Huling, 1885–1886
 Joseph L. Fry, 1887–1890
 James B. Pemberton, 1891–1892
 E. W. Staunton, 1893–1894
 J. A. deGruyter, 1895–1898
 W. Herman Smith, 1899–1900 (died in office)
 John B. Floyd, 1900–1901
 George S. Morgan, 1901–
 C. E. Rudesill
 John A. Jarrett
 James A. Holley
 William W. Wertz, 1929
 R. P. DeVan, 1934
 D. Boone Dawson, 1935–1947
 R. Carl Andrews, 1947–1950
 John T. Copenhaver, 1951–1959
 John A. Shanklin, 1959–1967
 Elmer H. Dodson, 1967–1971
 John G. Hutchinson, 1971–1980
 Joe F. Smith, 1980–1983
 James E. "Mike" Roark, 1983–1987
 Charles R. "Chuck" Gardner, 1987-1991
 Kent Strange Hall, 1991-1995
 G. Kemp Melton, 1995-1999
 Jay Goldman, 1999–2003
 Danny Jones, 2003–2019
 Amy Shuler Goodwin, 2019–present

Demographics

2020 census 
As of the 2020 census, there were 48,864 people and 21,779 households residing in the city. There were 25,766 housing units in Charleston. The racial makeup of the city was 74.7% White, 14.8% African American, 2.6% Asian, 0.3% Native American, 1.1% from other races, and 6.6% from two or more races. Hispanics or Latinos of any race were 2% of the population.

There were 21,779 households, of which  36.8% were married couples living together,  34.7% had a female householder with no spouse present, 22% had a male householder with no spouse present. The average household and family size was 2.94. The median age in the city was 41.7 years with 18.9% of the population under 18. The median income for a household in the city was $54,101 and the poverty rate was 17.5.5%.

2010 census 
As of the census of 2010, there were 51,400 people, 23,453 households, and 12,587 families residing in the city. The racial makeup of the city was 78.4% White, 15.5% African American, 0.2% Native American, 2.3% Asian, 0.3% from other races, and 3.2% from two or more races. Hispanic or Latino of any race were 1.4% of the population.

There were 23,453 households, of which 24.6% had children under the age of 18 living with them, 35.6% were married couples living together, 14.1% had a female householder with no husband present, 3.9% had a male householder with no wife present, and 46.3% were non-families. 39.4% of all households were made up of individuals, and 13.5% had someone living alone who was 65 years of age or older. The average household size was 2.11 and the average family size was 2.83.

The median age in the city was 41.7 years. 20.1% of residents were under the age of 18; 9% were between the ages of 18 and 24; 24.9% were from 25 to 44; 29.9% were from 45 to 64; and 16.1% were 65 years of age or older. The gender makeup of the city was 47.6% male and 52.4% female.

2000 census
As of the census of 2000, there were 53,421 people, 24,505 households, and 13,624 families residing in the city. The population density was 1,690.4 people per square mile (652.7/km). There were 27,131 housing units at an average density of 858.5 per square mile (331.5/km). The racial makeup of the city was 80.63% White, 15.07% Black or African American, 0.24% Native American, 1.83% Asian, 0.03% Pacific Islander, 0.30% from other races, and 1.91% from two or more races. 0.81% of the population were Hispanics or Latinos of any race. The five most common ancestries were German (12.4%), English (11.6%), American (11.4%), Irish (10.6%), and Italian (3.9%).

There were 24,505 households, out of which 23.7% had children under the age of 18 living with them, 38.9% were married couples living together, 13.5% had a female householder with no husband present, and 44.4% were non-families. 38.9% of all households were made up of individuals, and 14.5% had someone living alone who was 65 years of age or older. The average household size was 2.11 and the average family size was 2.82.

The age distribution was 20.7% under 18, 8.4% from 18 to 24, 27.9% from 25 to 44, 25.3% from 45 to 64, and 17.6% who were 65 or older. The median age was 41 years. For every 100 females there were 87.3 males. For every 100 females age 18 and over, there were 83.7 males.

The median income for a household in the city was $34,009, and the median income for a family was $47,975. Males had a median income of $38,257 versus $26,671 for females. The per capita income for the city was $26,017. About 12.7% of families and 16.7% of the population were below the poverty line, including 24.5% of those under age 18 and 11.3% of those age 65 or over.

Education
The city of Charleston has numerous schools that are part of Kanawha County Schools. The three high schools are:
Capital High School, a public school in the community of Meadowbrook. It was established by the consolidation of Charleston High School and Stonewall Jackson High School. It opened in 1989.
George Washington High School, a public school in the South Hills neighborhood. It opened in 1964.
Charleston Catholic High School, a Catholic school at the eastern edge of the city's downtown. It opened in 1923.

Former high schools
 Charleston High School, across the street from CAMC General Hospital. It was founded in 1916 and closed in 1989.
 Stonewall Jackson High School, on the West Side. It was founded in 1940 and converted to a middle school in 1989 after Capital High School opened.
Garnet High School was a historic African-American high school.

Middle schools
 West Side Middle School on the West Side
 John Adams Middle School in South Hills
 Horace Mann Middle School in Kanawha City
In July, 2020 Stonewall Jackson Middle School was renamed West Side Middle School.

Elementary schools
 Chamberlain Elementary School
 Edgewood Elementary School
 Elk Elementary School
 Grandview Elementary School
 Holz Elementary School
 Kanawha City Elementary School
 Kenna Elementary School
 Piedmont Elementary School
 Overbrook Elementary School
 Ruffner Elementary School
 Shoals Elementary School
 Weberwood Elementary School
 Bible Center School (Private – Christian/Non-Denominational)
 Charleston Montessori School (Private – Non-Sectarian)
 Mountaineer Montessori School (Private – Non-Sectarian)
 Sacred Heart School (Private – Catholic)
 St. Agnes School (Private – Catholic)
 Montrose Elementary School
 Mary C. Snow West Side Elementary School

Colleges and universities
Charleston hosts a branch campus of West Virginia University that serves as a clinical campus for the university's medical and dental schools. Students at either school must complete their class work at the main campus in Morgantown but can complete their clinical rotations at hospitals in Morgantown, the Eastern Panhandle, or Charleston. Students from West Virginia School of Osteopathic Medicine may also complete their clinical rotations at the branch campus, after completing their first two academic years at the main campus in Lewisburg.

The city is also home to a 1,000-student private college, the University of Charleston, formerly Morris Harvey College. The college is on MacCorkle Avenue along the banks of the Kanawha River (directly across from the capitol) in the community of South Ruffner.

Within the immediate area are West Virginia State University in Institute; and the South Charleston campus of both the BridgeValley Community and Technical College and of Marshall University. The region is also home to the Charleston Branch of the Robert C. Byrd Institute for Advanced Flexible Manufacturing, an independent program administered by Marshall University providing access to computer numerical control (CNC) equipment for businesses.

BridgeValley Community and Technical College also has a campus in Montgomery.

Charleston was also home to West Virginia Junior College's Charleston campus until late 2020, when it relocated to Cross Lanes. WV Junior College is accredited by the Accrediting Council for Independent Colleges and Schools to award diplomas and associate degrees. Part of the Kanawha Valley for almost 115 years, WV Junior College was originally established as Capitol City Commercial College on September 1, 1892. The College was originally established to train students in secretarial and business skills and has undergone changes in location and curriculum through the years.

Hospitals
CAMC (Charleston Area Medical Center) a complex of hospitals throughout the city.
 CAMC Memorial Hospital (in the Kanawha City neighborhood)
 CAMC General Hospital (in eastern downtown)
 CAMC Women and Children's Hospital (on the banks of the Elk River in downtown)

Thomas Health is a complex of hospitals and health care centers in the Charleston area.

 St. Francis Hospital (downtown)
 Thomas Memorial Hospital (South Charleston)

Highland Hospital (Kanawha City) is a behavioral health facility.

Economy

Notable companies headquartered in the Charleston area
Appalachian Power, owned by American Electric Power of Columbus, Ohio
Charleston Newspapers
Gestamp Automoción
MATRIC (Mid-Atlantic Technology, Research and Innovation Center) (South Charleston)
Tudor's Biscuit World (Nitro)
United Bank

Notable companies founded in Charleston
Shoney's restaurants
Heck's / L.A. Joe discount department stores

Economic development
The City of Charleston recognizes the Charleston Area Alliance as its economic development organization.

Culture

Annual events and fairs
Charleston is home to numerous annual events and fairs that take place throughout the city, from the banks of the Kanawha River to the capitol grounds.

The West Virginia Dance Festival, held between April 25 and 30, features dance students from across the state that attend classes and workshops in ballet, jazz and modern dance. At the finale, the students perform in the West Virginia State Theatre; these are free to the public.

Beginning in 1982, Symphony Sunday, held annually usually the first weekend in June, is a full day of music, food, and family fun, culminating in a free performance by the West Virginia Symphony Orchestra and a fireworks display following. Throughout the day, local performing community dance and music ensembles present a series of their own selected pieces with the final performance being by the West Virginia Symphony Orchestra. The local performing community dance and music ensembles that perform for Symphony Sunday include the Kanawha Valley Ringers, the West Virginia Kickers, the Charleston Metro Band, the West Virginia Youth Symphony, the Mountain State Brass Band, and the Kanawha Valley Community Band. The now-defunct Charleston Neophonic Orchestra has also performed at the event.

The NPR program Mountain Stage was founded in Charleston in 1983. The live performance music program, produced by West Virginia Public Broadcasting, and heard on the Voice of America and via NPR Music, records episodes regularly at the Culture Center Theater on the West Virginia State Capitol grounds.

Twice a year, in late April and again in early November, the West Virginia International Film Festival, where many domestic and international films are shown that range from full-length feature films, shorts, documentaries, animation and student films.

Charleston hosts the annual Gazette-Mail Kanawha County Majorette and Band Festival for the eight public high schools in Kanawha County. The festival began in 1947 and has continued on as an annual tradition. The festival is held at the University of Charleston Stadium at Laidley Field in downtown Charleston. It is the state's oldest music festival.

On Memorial Day weekend, the Vandalia Gathering is held on the grounds of the state capitol. Thousands of visitors each year enjoy traditional music, art, dance, stories, crafts and food that stems from the "uniqueness of West Virginia's mountain culture."

Since 2005 FestivALL has provided the Charleston area with cultural and artistic events beginning on June 20 (West Virginia Day) and including dance, theater, and music. FestivALL provides local artists a valuable chance to display their works and help get others interested in, and involved with, the local artistic community. Highlights include an art fair on Capitol Street and local bands playing live music at stages set up throughout downtown, as well as a wine and jazz festival on the campus of the University of Charleston featuring local and nationally known jazz artists and showcasing the products of West Virginia vineyards.

The Charleston Sternwheel Regatta is an annual river festival held on the Kanawha Boulevard by Haddad Riverfront Park on the Kanawha River. Founded in 1970, it was originally held during Labor Day weekend each year until its discontinuation in 2008, but after its revival in 2022, it is now held during Independence Day weekend. The event has carnival-style rides and attractions and live music from local and nationally known bands. The original event would start the Wednesday before Labor Day Weekend and ended the Sunday of Labor Day Weekend with a fireworks show on Sunday evening. Due to political differences between local sternwheel owners and factions of city government, sternwheel attendance declined in the years prior to 2008. Once a promising regatta, rivaling Tall Stacks in Cincinnati, it was discontinued after the 2008 festival season. In 2022, however, the festival was reinstated as an Independence Day weekend event, beginning Thursday and concluding on Independence Day on Monday with a fireworks display on Saturday and Monday. Charleston is the home to the largest population of privately owned sternwheel vessels in the United States.

Historical structures and museums

Charleston possesses a number of older buildings that represent a variety of historical architectural styles.  About fifty places in Charleston are included on the National Register of Historic Places.  A segment of the East End consisting of several blocks of both Virginia and Quarrier Streets, encompassing an area of nearly a full square mile, has been officially designated as a historical neighborhood.  This residential neighborhood has many houses dating from the late 19th and early 20th century as well as a few art deco style apartment buildings dating from the 1920s and early 30s.

Downtown Charleston is home to several commercial buildings that are between 80 and 115 years old, including such notable structures as the Security Building (corner of Virginia and Capitol Street), 405 Capitol Street (the former Daniel Boone Hotel), the Union Building (at the southern end of Capitol Street), the Kanawha County Courthouse, the Public Library (corner of Capitol and Quarrier Streets) and the Masonic Temple (corner of Virginia and Dickenson Street).

Also of note are several historic churches grouped closely together in a neighborhood just to the east of downtown; Basilica of the Co-Cathedral of the Sacred Heart (one of the two cathedrals of the Roman Catholic Diocese of Wheeling-Charleston), First Presbyterian Church, Kanawha United Presbyterian Church, St. John's Episcopal Church, Charleston Baptist Temple, St. Paul's Evangelical Lutheran Church, and Christ Church United Methodist.

Additional historic buildings can be found throughout the city, particularly in the broader East End, the West Side and Kanawha City.  Some of these buildings include:

Avampato Discovery Museum, (now part of the Clay Center for the Arts & Sciences)
Sunrise Museum, (now part of the Clay Center for the Arts & Sciences)
West Virginia State Museum
South Charleston Museum in South Charleston
St. George Orthodox Cathedral, founded in 1892.
St. Marks United Methodist Church
The Capitol Theater
Woman's Club of Charleston

Parks and outdoor attractions
University of Charleston Stadium at Laidley Field — Used for football, soccer, track, and festivals
Appalachian Power Park — Stadium of the Charleston Dirty Birds
Cato Park — Charleston's largest municipal park, including a golf course, Olympic-size swimming pool and picnic areas
Coonskin Park — Includes swimming pool, boathouse, clubhouse with dining facilities, tennis courts, putt putt golf, an 18-hole par 3 golf course, driving range, and fishing lake. Schoenbaum Soccer Field and Amphitheatre inside the park is the home of West Virginia United soccer team
Daniel Boone Park — A  park with a boat ramp, fishing and picnic facilities
Danner Meadow Park
Kanawha State Forest — (A  forest, including 46 campsites (in the community of Loudendale)
Magic Island — An area at the junction of the Elk River and the Kanawha River, near Kanawha Boulevard.
Davis Park
Haddad Riverfront Park
Ruffner Park
Joplin Park (South Charleston)

Sports

The West Virginia United is a soccer team that plays its home games at Schoenbaum Stadium in Charleston. The team plays in the USL League Two (USL2) — the fourth tier of the American Soccer Pyramid — in the South Atlantic Division of the Eastern Conference

Shopping
In 1983, the Charleston Town Center became the largest downtown mall east of the Mississippi River, the Town Center mall is a three-story shopping and dining facility, with 130 specialty stores. The closure of Macy's in 2019 meant J.C. Penney would be the sole remaining commercial anchor pad in the mall after Sears closed in 2017. The fourth and final anchor pad is currently a branch for Encova Insurance; it had previously been occupied by various other insurance companies since Montgomery Ward left the mall in 2000. In May 2021, it was announced that Hull Group, based out of Augusta GA, will add the Town Center to its roster of malls in the eastern US and will work towards redeveloping the mall.

There are five major shopping plazas in Charleston, two in the Kanawha City neighborhood – The Shops at Kanawha and Kanawha Landing along with three in the Southridge area, divided between Charleston and South Charleston — Southridge Centre, Dudley Farms Plaza, and The Shops at Trace Fork.

Major stores include The Shops at Kanawha plaza, Southridge Centre plaza, Dudley Farms Plaza, and The Shops at Trace Fork plaza.

Notable people

Diplomat and attorney Harriet C. Babbitt, born in Charleston
Olympic shot put gold and silver medalist Randy Barnes
 MMA fighter Brian Bowles, bantamweight champion
 Extreme metal band Byzantine formed and based in Charleston
 Kevin Canady, Professional wrestler founder of IWA East Coast
 Jean Carson, Actress
 Cisco Systems CEO John Chambers
 H. Rodgin Cohen, banker
 William E. Chilton, Newspaper publisher and U.S. Senator
 Basudeb DasSarma, Chemist 
 Douglas Dick, Actor 
 Barbara DuMetz, Photographer was born in Charleston
 George Crumb, Classical composer
 Dorian Etheridge, linebacker for the Atlanta Falcons
 Sarah Feinberg, interim president of the New York City Transit Authority and former head of the Federal Railroad Administration
 Conchata Ferrell, Actress
 Paul Frame, chiropractor and former ballet dancer
 Peter Frame, ballet dancer
 William Frischkorn, cyclist
Actress and Alias star Jennifer Garner was born in Houston, moved with her family to Princeton, West Virginia, then Charleston as a child and grew up there, graduating from city's George Washington High School
Elizabeth Harden Gilmore, civil rights activist
George H. Goodrich, justice, Superior Court of the District of Columbia
Alexis Hornbuckle, professional basketball player, NCAA champion at Tennessee
Professional baseball player and coach J. R. House
Basketball player and broadcaster Hot Rod Hundley
John G. Hutchinson, mayor 1971–80
Soap opera actress Lesli Kay who has appeared on As the World Turns, General Hospital and The Bold and the Beautiful
George King, NBA player and head coach of West Virginia and Purdue
Former Major League Baseball player and current sportscaster John Kruk was born in Charleston, but grew up in Keyser
Special effects artist Robert "RJ" Haddy was born and resides in Charleston
Actress Allison Hayes
Actress Ann Magnuson
NASA astronaut Jon McBride was born in Charleston
George Armitage Miller, one of the founders of the field of cognitive psychology, was born here.
Would-be presidential assassin Sara Jane Moore was born in Charleston
Actor Nick Nolte lived in the South Hills neighborhood of Charleston during the 1980s
National Football League player Rick Nuzum was born in Charleston
Pop singer Caroline Peyton
Phil Pfister, world's strongest man (2006), is a firefighter for CFD
 American author Eugenia Price
Creator of Droodles and television personality Roger Price
Actress Kristen Ruhlin
Country singer Red Sovine was born in Charleston
Civil rights activist Rev. Leon Sullivan was born in Charleston
NFL player Russ Thomas, general manager of Detroit Lions 1967–89, attended high school in Charleston
Actor and True Blood star Sam Trammell was born in New Orleans, but grew up in Charleston, graduating from city's George Washington High School
Tennis player Anne White attended John Adams Junior High School and graduated from George Washington High School.
Miami Heat point guard Jason Williams, who grew up in Belle in the same vicinity, was a high school teammate of Moss
Daniel Webster, longest-serving Florida legislator, was born in Charleston
 Athlete and coach Harry Young, member of College Football Hall of Fame
 Former NFL player Dennis Harrah
 Author Alec Ross, born and raised in Charleston

Media

Print
Charleston's only major newspaper is the Charleston Gazette-Mail.  It was formerly two separate newspapers - the morning Charleston Gazette and afternoon Daily Mail.

Radio
Charleston has a total of 11 radio stations (AM and FM) licensed in the city. Most of the stations are owned either by the West Virginia Radio Corporation or by the Bristol Broadcasting Company.

* represents radio stations that are licensed to the city of Charleston.

Television
The Charleston–Huntington TV market, is the second-largest television market (in terms of area) east of the Mississippi River and 64th largest in terms of households in the US serving counties in central West Virginia, eastern Kentucky, and southern Ohio. There are four VHF and ten UHF television stations in the market.

Infrastructure

Airports
Yeager Airport is West Virginia's largest airport, serving more than twice as many passengers as all other airports in the state combined. It is also home to the McLaughlin Air National Guard Base.

Rail

Amtrak, the national passenger rail service, provides tri-weekly service to Charleston via the Cardinal routes. The Amtrak station is on the south side of the Kanawha River, at 350 MacCorkle Avenue near downtown.

Historically, until the 1960s, several daily Chesapeake and Ohio Railway trains traversed central West Virginia, making stops in Charleston. Destinations in the Mid-West included St. Louis, Chicago, Detroit and Louisville. To the east the trains terminated in either Washington, D.C. or Newport News, Virginia. These featured the Fast Flying Virginian, George Washington, and the Sportsman. Into the late 1940s, the New York Central Railroad operated passenger trains between Columbus, Ohio and Charleston.

River

Interstate 64 crosses the Kanawha River four times as it passes through the Charleston metropolitan area. The Elk River flows into the Kanawha River in downtown Charleston.

Roads

Charleston is served by Interstate 64, Interstate 77, and Interstate 79. The West Virginia Turnpike's northern terminus is at the southeastern end of the city. Two U.S. routes, US 60, and US 119, cut through the city center. US 21 and US 35 formerly ran through Charleston.

WV 25, WV 61, WV 62, and WV 114 are all state highways that are within Charleston's city limits.

Mass transit
Charleston is served by Kanawha Valley Regional Transportation Authority.

Taxi service
C&H Taxi services the Kanawha Valley. Uber and Lyft also service the area.

Utilities
Electricity in Charleston is provided by Appalachian Power, a division of American Electric Power of Columbus, Ohio. Appalachian Power is headquartered in Charleston.
Suddenlink Communications provides the Charleston area's Cable TV.
Landline phone service in Charleston is provided by Frontier Communications.
The city's water supply is provided by Charleston-based West Virginia American Water, a subsidiary of American Water of Voorhees, NJ. The water that supplies Charleston is pumped from the Elk River and treated at the Kanawha Valley Water Treatment Plant.
Charleston's natural gas is supplied by Mountaineer Gas, a division of Allegheny Energy of Greensburg, Pennsylvania.

Law enforcement

The Charleston Police Department (CPD) is the second largest police department in the state of West Virginia, while being the largest municipal/city police department in the state. In 2008, Charleston Police had 168 sworn officers, 2 Animal Control Officers, and 29 civilian employees.

Sister city
Charleston's sister city is:
 Banská Bystrica, Slovakia (2009)

See also
  was built in Charleston in 1922 by the Charles Ward Engineering Works. She served as an Army transport and later a cruise ship on San Francisco Bay. She is now preserved as a floating restaurant in Burlingame, California, just south of San Francisco.

Notes

References

Bibliography

 
 
 
 
 
 
 
 
 
 
  + chronology
 
  (fulltext)

External links

City of Charleston, WV
 Items related to Charleston, various dates (via Digital Public Library of America).

FestivALL Charleston

 
Charleston, West Virginia metropolitan area
Cities in West Virginia
County seats in West Virginia
Populated places established in 1788
Cities in Kanawha County, West Virginia
Populated places on the Kanawha River
1788 establishments in Virginia